Steffen Handschuh (born 26 April 1980) is a German former professional footballer who played as a striker. He spent two seasons in the Bundesliga on the roster of VfB Stuttgart, but only played one league game, coming on as a substitute for Christian Tiffert and scoring the second goal in a 2–0 win against SC Freiburg on 7 April 2002. His father, Karl-Heinz Handschuh, played in the Bundesliga for 14 seasons from 1966 to 1980 for VfB Stuttgart and Eintracht Braunschweig.

References

External links
 

1980 births
Living people
Association football forwards
German footballers
Germany youth international footballers
VfL Kirchheim/Teck players
VfB Stuttgart players
VfB Stuttgart II players
Bundesliga players